The Lower Agno Watershed Forest Reserve is a Philippine protected area that straddles the Cordillera and Ilocos regions encompassing land from the provinces of Benguet and Pangasinan. Operated by the Lower Agno WFR Protected Area Management Board under the Department of Environment and Natural Resources, Lower Agno follows the Agno River corridor from the northern villages of Itogon to just north of the municipalities of San Manuel and San Nicolas. It is located in an important mining district and includes the reservoir of the San Roque Dam, the largest dam in the country and the prime source of water, hydropower and irrigation for surrounding regions in Luzon.

History
Lower Agno was initially part of the  Central Cordillera Forest Reserve established on February 16, 1929 through Proclamation No. 217 issued by Governor-General Henry L. Stimson, which declared 81.8% of the entire Igorot minority lands in the Cordilleras as protected area.

The Agno River Development Program was conceived in 1946 as part of the Philippine Power Program under President Manuel Roxas. The program involved the construction of six hydropower facilities along the river, with the first two, the Ambuklao (Agno I) and Binga (Agno II) dams, having been completed in 1956 and 1960 respectively. The Ambuklao-Binga sub-basin was then declared a separate forest reserve in 1966.

The Lower Agno reservation was established on November 22, 1983 as part of the creation of the third dam, the San Roque Dam (Agno V). An initial  of the Cordillera Central Forest Reserve was set aside for water resource protection and conservation by the Ministry of Natural Resources–Bureau of Forest Development, with  reserved for the multi-purpose dam project of the National Power Corporation approved by President Ferdinand Marcos on May 5, 1981. The San Roque Dam eventually began construction in 1998 and was completed on May 1, 2003.

Geography

The Lower Agno reserve protects a -long valley along the Agno River from just downstream of Binga Dam in the mountain village of Tinongdan to the foothills and alluvial plains of San Roque in San Manuel immediately below the San Roque dam and reservoir. The  reservation is located primarily in Itogon in the southern Cordillera Central, with small areas extending westward into Baguio and Tuba and southward into San Roque village, San Manuel and San Felipe East in San Nicolas. About 90 percent of the total land area of Itogon lies within the reservation.

Its highest point is Mount Ugo situated at its northeastern end. Other prominent peaks in the reserve include the  Mount Pigingan, Mount Ave Maria (Bidawan) and Mount Marikit.

The reserve is one of six protected areas located in the  Agno River Basin, the third largest river system in Luzon and the Philippines' fifth largest. It is a sub-catchment of the Agno River which drains into Lingayen Gulf from its headwaters at Mount Data further north. Its main tributary within the reservation is Twin River at its northern portion which has its source in the peaks around Baguio and which splits into several streams in the Gumatdang mining village, including the Ambalanga River, Liang Creek and Batuang Creek. The central and southern sections of the reserve are fed by other branches of the Agno River, namely the Laboy and Ambayoan rivers as well as several streams in the Padcal mining area of Ampucao and Dalupirip villages including Balog River, Albian Creek, Manaa and Salangan Creek.

The geology of Lower Agno WFR is characterized as predominantly mountain type dominated by undifferentiated and igneous intrusive rocks from the Miocene and Pliocene periods with minor outcrops of sedimentary and metamorphic rocks. It has pockets of silt, sandy and clay loam near its reservoir in Pangasinan.

Lower Agno is bounded to the west by both operating and abandoned gold and copper mining areas. Mining activities have been conducted in the area since 1906 with the opening of Benguet Corp.'s Acupan Mine. The gold mining company also operates the Antamok, Baco and Kelly sites along the Ambalanga River just east of Baguio and the Balatoc Mill. The Agno tributary of Ambalanga is also the site of the Itogon Mine of Itogon-Suyoc company which opened in 1926. South of these gold mines along the Albian and Manaa creeks are the Santo Tomas (Padcal) copper mines of Philex Mining Corp. which began operations in 1958.

The reservation is in the ancestral domain of the Kalanguya, Ibaloy and Iwaak minorities.

Ecology

Lower Agno is part of the Central Cordillera Terrestrial Biogeographic Region and contains mossy and tropical subalpine forests, second-growth tropical lower montane forests, grasslands and agricultural lands in lower elevations. The Pinus kesiya (Benguet pine) is the most dominant vegetation in the tropical subalpine forests of the reserve.

Lower Agno is a habitat of the Philippine deer, Philippine long-tailed macaque, Philippine warty pig, Northern Luzon giant cloud rat, Philippine cobra, monitor lizard and Malayan civet. At least eleven raptors have been documented in the reserve, including the Philippine hawk-eagle, eastern osprey, brahminy kite, Philippine serpent eagle, white-bellied sea eagle, rufous-bellied eagle, black-shouldered kite, crested honey buzzard, barred honey buzzard and Philippine falconet.

Gallery

References

Forest reserves of the Philippines
Geography of Benguet
Geography of Pangasinan
Tourist attractions in Benguet
Tourist attractions in Pangasinan
Birdwatching sites in the Philippines
Protected areas established in 1983
1983 establishments in the Philippines